The 2020–21 Supercopa de España was the 37th edition of the Supercopa de España, an annual football competition for clubs in the Spanish football league system that were successful in its major competitions in the preceding season.

It was the second straight edition played under the new format with four teams. They included 2019–20 Copa del Rey winners Real Sociedad and 2019–20 La Liga winners Real Madrid, 2019–20 Copa del Rey runners-up Athletic Bilbao and 2019–20 La Liga runners-up Barcelona. The competition was initially supposed to be held in Saudi Arabia like the previous year, but restrictions related to the global COVID-19 pandemic forced it to remain in Spain. The semi-finals took place in the cities of Córdoba and Málaga, on 13 and 14 January 2021. The final was played at Estadio de La Cartuja in Seville on 17 January 2021.

Athletic Bilbao won the tournament for their third Supercopa de España title.

Qualification
The tournament featured the winners and runners-up of the 2019–20 Copa del Rey and 2019–20 La Liga.

Qualified teams
The following four teams qualified for the tournament.

Draw
The draw took place on 17 December 2020 at the Royal Spanish Football Federation headquarters, in La Ciudad del Fútbol. As the result of the delayed 2020 Copa del Rey Final was unknown at the moment of the draw, it was held under the condition that both teams qualifying through their La Liga result (Real Madrid and Barcelona) could not face each other in the semi-finals.

Matches

Bracket

Semi-finals

Final

Notes

References

2020–21 in Spanish football cups
2020
January 2021 sports events in Spain
2021 in Andalusia